Juh may refer to:

People 
 Juh (1825–1883), Native American leader
 Polona Juh (born 1971), Slovenian actress

Other uses 
 Chizhou Jiuhuashan Airport, in Anhui Province, China
 Hõne language, a Jukunoid language of Nigeria
 Johanniter-Unfall-Hilfe, a German humanitarian organisation